Limnas is a genus of Asian plants in the grass family. It is found in northern and central Asia (Russia and Kazakhstan).

 Species
 Limnas malyschevii O.D.Nikif. - Krasnoyarsk, Yakutiya
 Limnas stelleri Trin. - Krasnoyarsk, Yakutiya, Irkutsk, Buryatiya, Khabarovsk Krai 
 Limnas veresczaginii Krylov & Schischk. - Kazakhstan

 formerly included
 Limnas arkansana - Limnodea arkansana
 Limnas pilosa - Limnodea arkansana

References

Pooideae
Poaceae genera
Grasses of Asia
Grasses of Russia
Flora of Central Asia